Siempre is an album by the group Magneto. It was edited on January 16, 1996 by the record label Sony Music.

Track listing
1. "Corazón perfecto"  
2. "No sé decir adiós"  
3. "A corazón abierto"  
4. "Obsesión"  
5. "Dame amor"  
6. "Tu libertad"  
7. "Cambiando el destino"  
8. "Para siempre"  
9. "Vuela vuela"  
10. "La puerta" del colegio  
11. "Mi amada"  
12. "Cuarenta grados" (Tudo a ver com teu olhar)  
13. "Malherido"  
14. "Sugar Sugar"  
15. "Con la ayuda de la amistad"   
16. "Balada mix: Para siempre/La puerta del colegio/Mi amada/Malherido"

1996 albums